George Leroy Converse (June 4, 1827 – March 30, 1897) was an American lawyer and politician who served three terms as a U.S. Representative from Ohio, representing three different districts from 1879 to 1885.

Life and career
Born in Georgesville, Ohio, Converse attended the common schools and Ohio Central College, and was graduated from Denison University, Granville, Ohio, in 1849. He studied law. He was admitted to the bar in 1851 and commenced practice in Columbus, Ohio, in 1852.

He served as prosecuting attorney of Franklin County in 1857.
He served as member of the State house of representatives 1860-1863 and 1874–1876 and speaker of the house in 1874.
He served as member of the State senate in 1864 and 1865.

Congress
Converse was elected as a Democrat to the Forty-sixth, Forty-seventh, and Forty-eighth Congresses (March 4, 1879 – March 3, 1885).
He served as chairman of the Committee on Public Lands (Forty-sixth Congress).
He was not a candidate for renomination in 1884 to the Forty-ninth Congress.

He resumed the practice of law and served as delegate to the Nicaraguan Canal Convention in 1892, and made chairman of this and the subsequent convention held in New Orleans.

Death
He died in Columbus, Ohio, March 30, 1897. He was interred in Green Lawn Cemetery there.

Sources

1827 births
1897 deaths
People from Franklin County, Ohio
County district attorneys in Ohio
Democratic Party Ohio state senators
Democratic Party members of the United States House of Representatives from Ohio
Speakers of the Ohio House of Representatives
Denison University alumni
Ohio Central College alumni
Burials at Green Lawn Cemetery (Columbus, Ohio)
19th-century American politicians
Democratic Party members of the Ohio House of Representatives